Plakortis myrae is a species of sea sponge in the order Homosclerophorida, first found in vertical walls of reef caves at depths of about  in the Caribbean Sea. This species has diods of two categories: large ones which are abundant (measuring 83–119μm long), and rare small ones (measuring 67–71μm long) with S-shaped centres; triods which are Y- or T-shaped (measuring 18–5μm long), and possesses abundant microrhabds (measuring 5–12μm long).

References

Further reading
Domingos, C. E. L. S. O., F. E. R. N. A. N. D. O. Moraes, and Guilherme Muricy. "Four new species of Plakinidae (Porifera: Homoscleromorpha) from Brazil." Zootaxa 3718.6 (2013): 530-544. 
Willenz, P. "Five new species of Homoscleromorpha (Porifera) from the Caribbean Sea and re-description of Plakina jamaicensis." Journal of the Marine Biological Association of the United Kingdom 2 (2014). 
Domingos, Celso, Anaíra Lage, and Guilherme Muricy. "Overview of the biodiversity and distribution of the Class Homoscleromorpha in the Tropical Western Atlantic." Journal of the Marine Biological Association of the United Kingdom: 1-11.

External links

Porifera Database

Homoscleromorpha
Animals described in 2014